Aspergillus fumigatus is a pathogenic filamentous fungus and is responsible for more infections worldwide than any other mould. Studies of the small non-coding RNA transcriptome of this fungus under a variety of different conditions and the subsequent generation of cDNA libraries from size selected small RNA species, identified several non-coding RNAs (ncRNA) within the fungal genome. The ncRNAs identified were further classified as small nucleolar RNAs (snoRNAs), small nuclear RNAs (snRNAs) or novel ncRNAs. The expression of these ncRNAs was also shown to be influenced by developmental stages of the fungus and environmental conditions. Comparative genomics showed that the snoRNAs present within A. fumigatus are conserved across other strains of fungus. This study also identified several partial tRNA sequences within the cDNA libraries which corresponded to either the 5’ or 3’ halves of tRNA molecules. These partial tRNAs are thought to have been created by enonuclolytic cleavage within the anti-codon loop. It has been suggested that these partial tRNA stall protein synthesis however, further studies are required to determine their exact function. The table below summarised the type, genome location and corresponding target sites of the ncRNAs identified in A. fumigatus.

Non-Coding RNAs present in  A. fumigatus

References

 
Non-coding RNA